Roman Skuhravý (born 6 January 1975) is a Czech football manager and former player. He played in the Czech First League as a defender for Jablonec, Baník Ostrava and Viktoria Plzeň.

He took charge of Jablonec in May 2013. In the 2014–15 season, he led the older youth team of Dukla Prague. Skuhravý led second league side Opava to the final of the 2016–17 Czech Cup in his first season, and to promotion to the Czech First League in his second season. He returned to Dukla in September 2018, replacing Pavel Drsek as manager of the first team.

Skuhravý played international football at under-21 level for Czech Republic U21.

His cousin Tomáš Skuhravý is a former international football player.

Honours

Managerial 
 FK Jablonec
Czech Cup: 2012–13
Czech Supercup: 2013

 SFC Opava
Czech Cup runner-up: 2016–17
Czech National Football League: 2017–18

References

External links

1975 births
Living people
Czech footballers
Czech football managers
Czech Republic under-21 international footballers
Czech First League players
Association football defenders
FK Jablonec players
FC Baník Ostrava players
FC Viktoria Plzeň players
FK Jablonec managers
FK Varnsdorf managers
SFC Opava managers
FK Dukla Prague managers
FK Železiarne Podbrezová managers
Czech First League managers
Czech National Football League managers
2. Liga (Slovakia) managers
Slovak Super Liga managers
Expatriate football managers in Slovakia
Czech expatriate sportspeople in Slovakia